Triomphante (Triumphant) was the third and last ship of the  of wooden-hulled, armored corvettes built for the French Navy during the 1870s. Her construction was delayed for years and the navy took advantage of the extended construction time to upgrade her armament in comparison to the lead ship, . She and her half-sister La Galissonnière participated in a number of battles during the Sino-French War of 1884–85. The ship remained in Asia and never returned to France after the war. She was condemned in 1896 and sold in 1903.

Design and description
The La Galissonnière-class ironclads were designed as faster, more heavily armed versions of the s by Henri Dupuy de Lôme. They used the same central battery layout as their predecessors, although the battery was lengthened  to provide enough room to work the larger  guns. Triomphante and her sister ship  were modified by Constructor Sabattier who reduced the number of screws from two to one to improve their sailing qualities by reducing the drag from the stationary propellers, added an  bow chaser under the forecastle and increased the caliber and number of the secondary armament.

Her crew numbered between 352 and 382 officers and men.

Propulsion
Triomphante had a single vertical compound steam engine driving a single propeller. Her engine was powered by four oval boilers. During sea trials her engine produced  and the ship reached .

Armament
Triomphante mounted four of her six 240-millimeter Modèle 1870 breech-loading guns in the central battery on the battery deck. The other two 240-millimeter guns were mounted in barbettes on the upper deck, sponsoned out over the sides of the ship, just forward of the funnel. A 194-millimeter breech-loading chase gun was fitted under the forecastle. Triomphantes secondary armament of six  breech-loading guns was also mounted on the upper deck.

The guns could fire both solid shot and explosive shells.

For defense against torpedo boats the ship also mounted four  Hotchkiss 5-barrel revolving guns. They had a rate of fire of about 30 rounds per minute. Triomphante also received several towed Harvey torpedoes.

Armor
The unarmored portions of their sides were protected by thin iron plates.

Service
Triomphante was laid down at Rochefort on 5 August 1869 and launched on 28 March 1877. While the exact reason for such prolonged construction time is not known, the budget for the French Navy was cut after the Franco-Prussian War of 1870–71 and the French dockyards had not been reformed with working practices more suitable for the industrial age. The ship was commissioned as the flagship of the Pacific Squadron on 17 October 1880 under the command of Rear Admiral Brossard du Corbigny. On 15 February 1883 she became flagship of the Levant Squadron under Rear Admiral Conte. On 28 May the admiral was ordered to shift his flag as Triomphante was ordered to Saigon.

Triomphante, and her half-sister La Galissonnière, were assigned to the Far East Squadron in 1884, under the command of Vice Admiral Amédée Courbet, and participated in several actions during the Sino-French War of 1884–85. Both ships fought in the Battle of Fuzhou, Triomphante sinking the wooden gunboat Zhenwei, and destroying coastal defenses defending the Min River. They supplied landing parties during the Battle of Tamsui in October 1884, but they were forced to retreat by Chinese troops, albeit at only a few casualties (5 killed and 10 wounded). Triomphante helped to capture the Pescadore Islands in March 1885 during the Pescadores Campaign, losing two killed and five wounded from her landing party. She became the flagship of the Far East Squadron on 1 April 1885 and remained as such until 5 February 1894 when she was reduced to reserve. Triomphante was condemned on 18 July 1896 and sold for scrap in 1903.

Footnotes

References
 

 
 

 
 

Ships built in France
La Galissonnière-class ironclads
Corvettes of France
1877 ships
Sino-French War naval ships